Adolf Jakob Wiklund (19 December 1921 – 21 September 1970) was a Swedish biathlon competitor who won two world championship titles in 1958, individual (20 km) and with a team. He competed at the 1960 Winter Olympics and finished 19th.

He was elected into the Swedish Biathlon Hall of Fame in September 2013.

References

1921 births
1970 deaths
Biathletes at the 1960 Winter Olympics
Swedish male biathletes
Olympic biathletes of Sweden
Biathlon World Championships medalists
20th-century Swedish people